Wakarusa can refer to several things in the United States:

 Wakarusa, Indiana
 Wakarusa, Kansas
 The Wakarusa River, a tributary of the Kansas River
 The Wakarusa War, part of the Bleeding Kansas violence before the American Civil War
 Wakarusa Music and Camping Festival